Kees Hoving (1919, Medan, Indonesia – 1991, Utrecht, Netherlands) was a Dutch swimmer who specialized in the 100m freestyle event. He won the 1938 European Aquatics Championships with a time of 59.8 seconds, becoming the first Dutch male athlete to win a European swimming title and to swim 100 meters within one minute. After that he did not compete internationally, except for the 1947 European Aquatics Championships, due to World War II and later due to a conflict with his swimming club. However, he won the national championships in 1937, 1938, 1941, 1946 and 1948, and set eight national records between 1937 and 1946. His records were broken only in 1950, by Joris Tjebbes.

References

1919 births
1991 deaths
Dutch male freestyle swimmers
European Aquatics Championships medalists in swimming
Sportspeople from Medan
Dutch people of the Dutch East Indies
20th-century Dutch people